Ksingmul (Ksing Mul, Puoc) is a Mon–Khmer language spoken by the Ksingmul people of Vietnam and Laos.

Varieties
Jerold Edmondson (2010: 144), citing Đặng Nghiêm Vạn, et al. (1972: 254 ff.), lists 3 major varieties of Ksingmul. Ksingmul Nghệt is the most conservative variety.
Ksingmul Nghệt: Nà Nghệt Village, Xiêng Khọ District, Sầm Nưa Province (Houaphan Province), Laos
Ksingmul Dạ: Chiềng On Village, Yên Châu District, Sơn La Province, Vietnam
Ksingmul Đồng

Phonology 

All monophthongs can be long or short, apart from /ɔː/ which can only be long.

References

Edmondson, Jerold A. 2010. "The Kháng language of Vietnam in comparison to Ksingmul (Xinh-mun)." In Kenneth A. McElhanon and Ger Reesink, A Mosaic of languages and cultures: studies celebrating the career of Karl J. Franklin, 138–154. SIL e-Books, 19. [Dallas]: SIL International. http://www.sil.org/resources/archives/9267

External links
http://projekt.ht.lu.se/rwaai RWAAI (Repository and Workspace for Austroasiatic Intangible Heritage)
http://hdl.handle.net/10050/00-0000-0000-0003-9380-C@view Ksingmul in RWAAI Digital Archive

Mangic languages
Khmuic languages
Languages of Vietnam
Languages of Laos